Bocconia may refer to :

 Bocconia (plant), a genus of flowering plants in the poppy family, Papaveraceae
 Bocconia, Numidia, an Ancient city and former bishopric in Numidia, now a Latin Catholic titular see